WYBR (102.3 FM, "Today's Hit Music, Y102") is a radio station in Big Rapids, Michigan, broadcasting a hot adult contemporary format. Its signal can be heard as far south as Rockford, Michigan, as far north as Cadillac, Michigan and as far east as Mount Pleasant, Michigan.

The station began broadcasting in 1981 as WAAQ, "The Music Machine, Q102", with an adult contemporary format. In 1992 WAAQ was sold and became WPZX, a CHR/Top 40 station known as "Power 102".  In 1994, the station was sold again and WPZX became "Y102", originally employing a Hot AC format from ABC Radio Networks known as "The Best Hits, The Best Variety" (now "Today's Hit Music"). The station dropped the ABC satellite format in 2000 and continues as a Hot AC station to this day.

Specialty programming includes "The Retro Lunch Hour" weekdays at noon, "The Commercial Free Drive at Five" weekdays at 5 p.m and The Zach Sang Show weekday nights. Weekend specialty shows include both the 1980s and 1990s versions of Back Trax USA with Kid Kelly, the Hot AC version of Rick Dees' Weekly Top 40, Saturday and Sunday nights feature The Open House Party with Kannon, and SonRise (contemporary Christian music) on Sunday mornings.

Sources 
WYBR Website
Michiguide.com - WYBR History

External links

YBR
Hot adult contemporary radio stations in the United States